Fortune Center, also known as Yuexiu Financial Tower, is a 68-storey,  supertall skyscraper in Guangzhou, Guangdong, China. Construction started in 2011 and was completed in 2015.

See also
List of tallest buildings in China

References

Skyscraper office buildings in Guangzhou
Buildings and structures in Guangzhou

Buildings and structures completed in 2015